The Arktisch-Alpiner Pflanzengarten und Alpine Staudengärtnerei is a private botanical garden specializing in alpine plants. It is located at OT Gorschmitz 14, Leisnig, Saxony, Germany, and open several days per week in the warmer months, without charge.

The garden is maintained by Danilo Geißler as an adjunct to his commercial nursery. It contains about 2,000 specimens of arctic and alpine plants organized by geographic sections as follows: European Dolomites mountains, the Canadian Rockies, the South Island of New Zealand, Arctic regions from Finland to Murmansk. It also contains a large collection of dwarf willow (Salix) and ongoing experimental plantings.

See also 
 List of botanical gardens in Germany

External links 
 Arktisch-Alpiner Pflanzengarten und Alpine Staudengärtnerei 
 Leisnig: Arktisch-Alpiner Pflanzengarten und Alpine Staudengärtnerei
 BGCI entry

Botanical gardens in Germany
Gardens in Saxony